Troutbeck railway station was situated on the Cockermouth, Keswick and Penrith Railway between Penrith and Cockermouth in Cumberland (now in Cumbria), England. The station served the hamlet of Troutbeck. It opened to passenger traffic on 2 January 1865, and closed on 6 March 1972.

External links
 Keswick to Penrith Railway Re-opening

References

 
 
 

Disused railway stations in Cumbria
Former Cockermouth, Keswick and Penrith Railway stations
Railway stations in Great Britain opened in 1865
Railway stations in Great Britain closed in 1972
Beeching closures in England
Hutton, Cumbria